Suat Suna (born 26 May 1975) is a Turkish pop music singer, composer and songwriter. Throughout his professional music career, he has released 12 studio albums.

Discographi

References

External links 
 Suat Suna official website
 

Living people
1975 births
Musicians from Istanbul
Turkish male singers
Turkish pop singers
Turkish singer-songwriters
Turkish songwriters